Industrial Promotion Services (IPS) is the industrial development arm of the Aga Khan Fund for Economic Development (AKFED). AKFED is a member of the Aga Khan Development Network.

Location
IPS is headquartered in Nairobi, Kenya, and has subsidiaries in Tanzania and Uganda.

Development projects
The development projects that IPS is involved in include:
 An equity participation in the 74MW Kipevu II Power Plant in Kenya
 An equity participation in the 288MW Azito Power Plant in Ivory Coast
 An equity participation in the 250MW Bujagali Power Plant in Uganda. Other partners in this project include Sithe Global Power LLC, an American power development company. Sithe Global Power LLC, is owned by the Blackstone Group and Reservoir Capital Group.
 Through its Special Purpose Vehicle subsidiary West Nile Rural Electrification Company, an equity participation in the 3.5MW Nyagak I Power Station in West Nile sub-region, in Northern Uganda.

Ownership

The shareholders in IPS are summarized in the table below:

DEG stands for German Investment Corporation, the investment arm of the Federal Republic of Germany

See also 
 Aga Khan Fund for Economic Development
 DEG
 KfW

External links 
Bujagali Hydro Power Project Homepage
AKFED Homepage

References

Aga Khan Development Network
Financial services companies of Kenya
1963 establishments in Kenya